Dąbrowskie-Osiedle  is a settlement in the administrative district of Gmina Olecko, within Olecko County, Warmian-Masurian Voivodeship, in northern Poland.

References

Villages in Olecko County